
Gmina Wilczyce is a rural gmina (administrative district) in Sandomierz County, Świętokrzyskie Voivodeship, in south-central Poland.

Villages
Gmina Wilczyce contains the villages and settlements of Bożęcin, Bugaj, Dacharzów, Daromin, Dobrocice, Gałkowice-Ocin, Łukawa, Ocinek, Pęczyny, Pielaszów, Przezwody, Radoszki, Tułkowice, Wilczyce, Wysiadłów and Zagrody.

Neighbouring gminas
Gmina Wilczyce is bordered by the gminas of Dwikozy, Lipnik, Obrazów, Ożarów and Wojciechowice.

References

Polish official population figures 2006

Wilczyce
Sandomierz County